The canary-flycatchers (Culicicapa)  are a genus of birds in the family Stenostiridae. The genus was erected by Robert Swinhoe in 1871. It is restricted to Southeast Asia. Canary-flycatchers have a fine-tipped bill which becomes broad and flat at the base. The sexes are indistinguishable in plumage. Young birds are neither spotted nor streaked.

There are two species:
 Grey-headed canary-flycatcher, Culicicapa ceylonensis
 Citrine canary-flycatcher, Culicicapa helianthea

References